The Salto Morato Private Natural Heritage Reserve ( is a private natural heritage reserve in the state of Paraná, Brazil. It protects an area of Atlantic Forest that is home to many endemic bird species.

Location

The Salto Morato Private Natural Heritage Reserve is in the municipality of Guaraqueçaba on the coast of the north of Paraná.
Of this,  has been officially recognized as a Private Natural Heritage Reserve, but the remainder is managed in the same way and should be recognized after regularization of land titles.
There are interpretive trails, a visitor center, kiosks, camping, lodging for researchers, a research center and a laboratory.
There is a meteorological station that is part of the Paraná Meteorological System (SIMEPAR).
Pets are not allowed.
The reserve has supported scientific research from time of opening.

Environment

The reserve protects an area of Atlantic Forest.
It includes alluvial, submontane, montane and high montane formations. 
It also protects landscapes of rare beauty, such as the Garacuí and Morato mountains and the Salto Morato waterfall, with a height of about 
It is home to a significant number of endemic species of birds.
646 vascular plant species have been identified as well as 93 mammal species, 325 bird species, 36 reptile species, 61 amphibian species and 55 fish species.
The reserve is part of the Lagamar Mosaic of conservation units.
Researchers have found two new species of fish and a new species of three-toed frog.

History

The land was purchased by the Fundação Grupo Boticário de Proteção à Natureza in 1994 with support from The Nature Conservancy, and was recognized as a Private Natural Heritage Reserve the same year.
It opened to the public in 1996.
UNESCO recognized the reserve in 1999 as a natural World Heritage Site.

Notes

Sources

Private natural heritage reserves of Brazil
Protected areas of Paraná (state)
1994 establishments in Brazil